The director of the United States Marshals Service, abbreviated USMS director, is the head and chief executive of the United States Marshals Service (USMS). The director oversees and manages the operations of the Marshals Service and directly superintends the various United States Marshals, which lead all USMS personnel within their respective federal judicial district. The director was originally referred to as "Chief United States Marshal" from 1957 to 1970.

The director of the Marshals Service is appointed by the president of the United States, with the advice and consent of the Senate. The director reports to the attorney general.

Powers and duties 
 establishes the United States Marshals Service, abbreviated USMS, as a bureau of the U.S. Department of Justice and places a director at its helm. The director – like any other high-ranking executive branch officer – is directly appointed by the president, with the advice and consent of the Senate, and serves under the authority and control of the United States Attorney General.

The director is responsible for the supervision and direction of the Marshals Service "in the performance of its duties". All United States Marshals, the local heads of the USMS, report to the director. Additionally, the director may exercise any functions delegated to them by the Attorney General.

 requires the director to consult with the Judicial Conference of the United States on a continuing basis to discuss the security-related needs of the federal judiciary. This clause serves to ensure that the views of the judiciary are taken into account when it comes to staff assignment, policy priorities, allocation of resources, and so-called "judicial security" in general, which includes the safeguarding of federal courthouses and other buildings accommodating the judiciary, as well as the personal safety of, and the assessment of threats made to, judicial officers, and the protection of all other judicial personnel. 

Furthermore, chapter 37 of the U.S. Code empowers the director to designate the stations and offices of the U.S. Marshals, appoint complementary personnel and fix their compensation, and administer oaths and take affirmations of officers and employees of the Marshals Service.

List of officeholders

Deputies 
The deputy director of the Marshals Service is the principal deputy to the director and oversees the chief of district affairs and the Office of Professional Responsibility.

The associate director for operations oversees the Investigative Operations Division, Judicial Security Division, Tactical Operations Division, Justice Prisoner and Alien Transportation System, Witness Security Division, and the Prisoner Operations Division.

The associate director for administration oversees the Training Division, Human Resources Division, Information Technology Division, Office of Public and Congressional Affairs, Management Support Division, Asset Forfeiture Division.

See also 

 Chief, IRS Criminal Investigation
 Director of the Central Intelligence Agency
 Director of the Federal Bureau of Investigation
 Director of the United States Secret Service
 Federal law enforcement in the United States

References

Notes

External links 
 U.S. Marshals Service leadership

United States Marshals Service
United States Department of Justice